The World Without a Mask is a 1934 German science fiction film directed by and starring Harry Piel. It also features Olga Tschechowa and Rudolf Klein-Rogge.

Cast
 Harry Piel as Harry Palmer 
 Kurt Vespermann as Dr. Tobias Bern 
 Anni Markart as Erika Hansen 
 Olga Tschechowa as Betty Bandelow 
 Rudolf Klein-Rogge as Merker 
 Hubert von Meyerinck as E.W. Costa 
 Philipp Manning as Dr. Niemann 
 Hermann Picha
 Gerhard Dammann
 Ernst Behmer
 Charly Berger
 Karl Platen
 Paul Rehkopf
 Wolfgang von Schwindt

Release
The World Without a Mask premiered in Berlin at the Capitol Theatre on 9 March 1934.

Sources

Footnotes

Sources

External links 
 

1934 films
German science fiction films
1930s science fiction films
1930s German-language films
Films directed by Harry Piel
Films of Nazi Germany
Tobis Film films
German black-and-white films
1930s German films